Rawatgaun is a village located in Bheri municipality in Jajarkot District of Karnali Province of Nepal. The aerial distance from Rawatgaun to Nepal's capital Kathmandu is approximately 323 km.

References

Villages in Jajarkot District
Populated places in Jajarkot District